UK Athletics (UKA) is the governing body for the sport of athletics in the United Kingdom. It is responsible for overseeing the governance of athletics events in the UK as well as athletes, their development, and athletics officials. The organisation outwardly rebranded itself as British Athletics in 2013, although it remains legally known as UK Athletics, and continues to use the UK Athletics name in internal governance.

UK Athletics is structured as a non-profit company limited by guarantee. It has four member organisations from each of the constituent countries of the United Kingdom: England Athletics, Scottish Athletics, Welsh Athletics, and Athletics Northern Ireland.

History
UK Athletics was founded in 1999 as a successor to the British Athletics Federation, which had collapsed for financial reasons. Prominent among the reasons was the cost of the legal bills in the Diane Modahl contract dispute case.

Former long distance runner David Moorcroft, previously Chief Executive of the British Athletics Federation, continued in the same role at the newly formed UKA. He headed the organisation until 2006 when he stepped down after Great Britain's worst performance at a European Athletics Championships for twenty years. The results in Gothenburg (their sole gold medal coming in the 100 m relay) were below expectations and failed to meet the target for improving British athletics in preparation for the upcoming 2012 London Olympics. Moorcroft's departure triggered a restructuring of the organisation and the creation of the role of chairman, to which businessman Ed Warner was appointed. The current chief executive is Niels de Vos. Lynn Davies, the former Olympic champion long jumper, is the incumbent president.

Charles van Commenee was made national head coach, a newly created role, in September 2008. Shortly afterwards Peter Eriksson was appointed head coach of the Paralympic Programme. Van Commenee stepped down after the London 2012 Olympics due to the team's failure to meet the medal target he had set. This was despite a reasonably favourable reaction to Britain's achievement of six medals and the desire of UK Athletics that he should remain in the post. Van Commenee was succeeded by Peter Eriksson, who served only seven months of a five-year contract before resigning for personal reasons. UKA Performance Director Neil Black was appointed temporary replacement. A restructuring announced in December 2013 saw the single role of head coach replaced by three heads of department (endurance, sprints and field events).

The principal sponsor of the organisation, as of April 2013, is Sainsbury's, replacing Aviva.

The athletes compete in Olympic competition under the brand name of Team GB.

The current CEO is Jack Buckner and the Chair is Ian Beattie.

See also
British records in athletics
London Grand Prix
England Athletics
Scottish Athletics
Welsh Athletics

References

External links
 
 Power of 10 (UK Athletics rankings and statistics)
 UK & Ireland Athletic Club Directory

Athletics in the United Kingdom
United Kingdom
Great Britain
Organisations based in Birmingham, West Midlands
Sport in Birmingham, West Midlands
1999 establishments in the United Kingdom
Athletics
Sports organizations established in 1999